Haylee Ruth Roderick is an American dancer, choreographer, and actress.

Early life
Haylee Roderick was born in Salt Lake City Utah.

Career
Roderick is a professional dancer and choreographer. She has received extensive training in classical and contemporary ballet, jazz, and hip-hop at the acclaimed Center Stage Performing Arts Studio in Orem, Utah. She was a principal dancer in the Disney film High School Musical 3. She was also a performer in the 82nd Academy Awards. Roderick is a dancer on Glee and has accompanied the cast for the Glee Live! In Concert! tour. She is on the April 2011 cover of Dance Spirit Magazine. Roderick has been featured in many music videos, including Hotel Nacional by Gloria Estefan featuring Susan Lucci, Patient by Twin Shadow, Eight Days by Chelsea Williams, Over You by Zak Waters, and Transcendence (Orchestral) by Lindsey Stirling.

Filmography

Television

Music Videos

References

External links

21st-century American actresses
American female dancers
Dancers from Utah
American contemporary dancers
American film actresses
American television actresses
Living people
Year of birth missing (living people)